Proxhyle cinerascens is a moth in the family Erebidae. It was described by Hervé de Toulgoët in 1959.

It is found in Andasibe, Madagascar.
This species has a wingspan of 14–15 mm, strongly bipectinated antennae in the male. The forewings are greyish with blackish spots, hindwings yellowish orange, bordered broadly with brown.

References

Moths described in 1959
Lithosiini